Windbreaker may refer to:
Windbreaker, a thin jacket
Windbreaker, (or Windbreak or Breeze Blocker) a sheet of material (usually Hessian) supported by poles (usually wooden) to protect from the wind - see Windbreak
Windbreaker, a Transformers action figure
"Windbreaker", a song by Northlane from their 2013 album Singularity
Trophy (countermeasure), aka "Windbreaker", an active protection system (APS) designed to defend both light and heavy armored fighting vehicles from anti-tank missiles and rocket-propelled grenades

See also
Windbreak